Roger Simon Bivand (born 5 April 1951) is a British geographer, economist and professor at the Norwegian School of Economics. He specialises in open source software for spatial analysis, and played a major role in developing functions for spatial data in the R statistical programming language, including the R packages sp, rgdal, maptools and rgrass7. His book Applied Spatial Data Analysis with R (2008), coauthored with Edzer Pebesma and Virgilio Gómez-Rubio, is considered "the authoritative resource on R's spatial capabilities".

Education and career

Bivand was born in Bristol on 5 April 1951. He studied geography at the University of Cambridge and obtained his PhD from the London School of Economics in 1975, with a thesis on the economic geography of Sogn og Fjordane in Norway. He went on to receive a habilitation from the Adam Mickiewicz University in Poznań in 1982. 

Bivand joined the Norwegian School of Economics in 1988 and was appointed a professor in 1996. He has been an editor of several academic journals, including the Journal of Statistical Software, The R Journal, the Journal of Geographical Systems, Geographical Analysis and the Norwegian Journal of Geography. In 2018 he received a Lifetime Achievement Award from the OpenGeoHub Foundation.

Selected publications

References

External links 
 

1951 births
Living people
Scientists from Bristol
British geographers
British economists
Alumni of the University of Cambridge
Alumni of the London School of Economics
Academic staff of Adam Mickiewicz University in Poznań
Academic staff of the Norwegian School of Economics
R (programming language) people